Hola Airport is an airport in Kenya.

Location
Hola Airport  is located in the town of Hola, Tana River County, in southeastern Kenya, close to the Indian Ocean coast and to the International border with Somalia.

The geographic coordinates of this airport are:1° 31' 12.00"S, +40° 0' 14.00"E (Latitude:-1.520000; Longitude:40.003890).

Overview
Hola Airport is a small civilian airport, serving Hola and surrounding communities.

Airlines and destinations
At the moment, there is no regular, scheduled airline service to Hola Airport.

See also
 Kenya Airports Authority
 Kenya Civil Aviation Authority
 List of airports in Kenya

References

External links
  Location of Hola Airport At Google Maps
   Website of Kenya Airports Authority

Airports in Kenya
Coast Province
Tana River County